Robert Holt ( – 21 June 1909) was a New Zealand builder, undertaker, timber merchant and sawmiller. He was born in Oldham, Lancashire, England, in about 1833.

In 2000, Holt was posthumously inducted into the New Zealand Business Hall of Fame.

References 

1833 births
1909 deaths
People from Oldham
New Zealand sawmillers
English emigrants to New Zealand